Stephen Findeisen, better known by his online alias Coffeezilla, is an American YouTuber and crypto journalist who is known primarily for his channel in which he investigates and discusses alleged online scams, usually surrounding cryptocurrency, decentralized finance and internet celebrities.  Before Coffeezilla, Findeisen was active on YouTube with the channel Coffee Break between 2017 and 2020.

Early life 
Findeisen holds a degree in chemical engineering from Texas A&M University. Before his YouTube career, he sold houses for a local builder.

Career

Career beginnings 
Findeisen was motivated to hunt down scams after his mother, who had been diagnosed with cancer, was persuaded to buy questionable products with the belief that they would help cure her. His mother would later end up recovering after surgery. He began his career as a YouTuber by uploading videos in which he makes allegations about influencers and financial commentators.

Save the Kids token
He gained international recognition after making a series of videos that investigated Save the Kids token, a cryptocurrency widely seen as a pump and dump scheme. He claimed that former FaZe Clan member Frazier Khattri (FaZe Kay) collaborated with YouTube prankster Sam Pepper. In response, Khattri's lawyers threatened to sue Findeisen in a cease and desist letter unless he retracted his statements, but Findeisen called the cease and desist letter "absolute toilet paper".

Safemoon
In April 2022, Findeisen accused the SafeMoon team for misappropriating millions of dollars. According to Findeisen, Safemoon CEO John Karony, has been removing funds from the liquidity pool which is the primary explanation for the crypto's price pattern. Findeisen found evidence of transactions that showed Safemoon's liquidity wallet moving funds to a wallet dubbed the "Gabe (6abe) wallet" which withdrew funds to a separate company run by Karony. Former SafeMoon CTO Thomas "Papa" Smith was the only person who responded to Findeisen's claims stating that funds were taken from the “locked liquidity pool” before Karony’s appointment. He sent Smith evidence of this in the form of a blockchain transaction showing an outflow of 36.7 trillion tokens from the liquidity pool, dated March 5, 2021. Former SafeMoon CTO, Thomas Smith who had a role as a blockchain advisor for StrikeX, was dismissed by the company after the fraud allegations uncovered by Findeisen. Coffeezilla has made multiple other reports on Safemoon, including the pump and dump scheme against many influencers including Soulja Boy, Logan Paul, Lil Yachty, Ben Phillips amongst others as well as highlighting the controversy surrounding the Safemoon CEO suing his own mother.

FTX
Findeisen additionally was active during the bankruptcy of FTX, interviewing FTX founder Sam Bankman-Fried on three occasions and describing Bankman-Fried's responses during the last interview as an admission of fraud. In light of his involvement with investigating FTX in particular, The Washington Post credited Findeisen as one of the most powerful independent news sources when it comes to the cryptocurrency industry. In a February 2023 appearance on the Lex Fridman Podcast, Findeisen bashed Bankman-Fried even further, explaining his whole process behind exposing the FTX scandal.

CryptoZoo
In December 2022, Findeisen published a three-part series on NFT-based game CryptoZoo, a project Logan Paul developed and founded. He criticized the project for not delivering on its promises and alleged that the team engaged in market manipulation. In a now-deleted video, Paul responded to the allegations, while also threatening legal action against Findeisen for defamation and claiming that Findeisen broke "criminal and civil laws" by uploading a recording of a phone call with his manager, Jeff Levinan. He has since withdrawn the threat.

References

External links 
 YouTube Channel Coffeezilla
 YouTube Channel Coffee Break

2018 establishments in the United States
American male journalists
American video bloggers
American YouTubers
English-language YouTube channels
Living people
Social media influencers
Texas A&M University alumni
YouTube channels launched in 2018
YouTube controversies
YouTubers from Texas
Year of birth missing (living people)